Louis Cato (born May 3, 1985) is the bandleader of The Late Show Band, the house band for The Late Show with Stephen Colbert. Cato is a multi-instrumentalist who plays bass, guitar, percussion, low brass, and others, in addition to vocals. He is also a songwriter, with one album to his credit and a second in production.

Early life
Louis Cato was born on May 3, 1985, in Lisbon, Portugal, to African American parents. At the time, his father was stationed in Portugal by the US military, but the family left the country a few months after Cato's birth and he grew up in Albemarle, North Carolina. His mother was a church organist, and Cato began playing drums at age two. He attended Berklee College of Music in Boston, Massachusetts, for two semesters before leaving in 2004.

Career

Cato met Marcus Miller at a jam session at the North Sea Jazz Festival. They subsequently toured for several years.

Cato joined the band Stay Human at the inception of Colbert's Late Show in 2015 and served as interim bandleader whenever the original leader Jon Batiste was unavailable. Batiste took a break from the Colbert show in the summer of 2022, and announced on August 12 that he would not be returning. Cato was appointed the new bandleader of the house band, renamed "The Late Show Band", and formally took over on September 6. Colbert described Cato as a musical genius, saying "He can play basically every instrument over there. Give him an afternoon, he’ll learn how to play Mozart on a shoehorn."

Cato released his first solo record, titled Starting Now, in 2016 through RSVP Records. He wrote all the songs in collaboration with his writing partner Adam Tressler.

In 2019, Cato toured Ireland as a drummer with Paul Brady.

Cato lived and worked with Michael League and Justin Stanton of Snarky Puppy, Gisela João, and Becca Stevens while working on the album Mirrors in 2020. The album shares the name with the jazz supergroup the musicians formed.

Cato has announced he is in post-production on his new album Reflections as of August 2022.

Personal life
Cato was involved in a tour bus crash while on tour in Switzerland with Marcus Miller in November 2012. Cato stated he broke his back in two places and sprained his neck.

Cato is married and has two children.

References

External links

Living people
People from Albemarle, North Carolina
American bandleaders
African-American male guitarists
Berklee College of Music alumni
American jazz multi-instrumentalists
African-American jazz musicians
The Late Show with Stephen Colbert
The Late Show Band members
Musicians from Lisbon
21st-century African-American musicians
Year of birth missing (living people)